"A Million and One" is a song written by Yvonne Devaney, which was a hit single for Billy Walker, Dean Martin, and Vic Dana in 1966.

"A Million and One" was first released by Billy Walker, in late May 1966. Walker's version reached No. 2 on Billboards Hot Country Singles chart.

Dean Martin's version spent 7 weeks on the Billboard Hot 100 chart, peaking at No. 41, while reaching No. 4 on Billboards Easy Listening chart. In Canada, Martin's version reached No. 64 on the RPM 100 and No. 23 on the CHUM Hit Parade.

Dean Martin's version was ranked No. 49 on Billboards ranking of "Top Easy Listening Singles" of 1966.

Vic Dana's version spent 3 weeks on the Billboard Hot 100 chart, peaking at No. 71, while reaching No. 24 on Billboards Easy Listening chart.

References

1966 singles
1966 songs
Billy Walker (musician) songs
Dean Martin songs
Monument Records singles
Reprise Records singles